Therhi is a town and Union Council in Khairpur District, Sindh province, Pakistan.

The town is 7 kilometers away from Khairpur City, in the direction of Sukkur via the National Highway.

See also 
 Therhi Massacre

References

Populated places in Khairpur District